Ratna Manjari Devi  was an Indian politician. She was elected to the Odisha Legislative Assembly as an independent defeating Binayak Acharya in 1977 from Berhampur.

References

Women in Odisha politics
Odisha MLAs 1977–1980
1935 births
2019 deaths